PRÓ-VIDA, Cosmic Integration (or simply PRÓ-VIDA), is an institution created and founded in 1978 by the medical surgeon and philosopher Celso Charuri in Brazil. It proposes to guide those interested in the development of the human potential, promoting courses in which, according to Charuri, "subjects within the mental, physical and spiritual spheres are discussed and analyzed".

Objective
According to its founder, the development of this potential gives the human being better conditions for attaining their objectives. Through mental training, it would be possible for man to amplify his consciousness, reaching a state that would allow them a differential action in the environment in which they act.

After beginning activities in the city of São Paulo, at present PRÓ-VIDA has participating nuclei in various other Brazilian cities and in other countries, such as Argentina, Bolivia, Chile, Italy, Mexico, Paraguay, Portugal, Spain and the United States of America, besides four country clubs: three in Brazil and one in Argentina.

Its main public manifestation is linked to the Social Responsibility sector. Through its Central Geral do Dízimo PRÓ-VIDA (General Central for the Tithe PRÓ-VIDA, CGD), a non-profit organization, the organization donates to charities such as day care centers, elderly care institutions, orphanages and institutions that offer treatment and education for disabled children. CGD also builds vocational schools. According to statistics of the institution, more than 7,000 charities have already benefitted from these donations.

The content of its courses is not revealed publicly and participants are quite discreet as to their activities. This secrecy gives the institution an air of mystery that makes people curious about its inner workings. This encouraged a well-known women's magazine to publish an article in November 1996 containing strong criticism against PRÓ-VIDA. According to it, PRÓ-VIDA aimed exclusively at profits, the contents of its courses were pseudo-scientific and the criteria for evaluating participants were not very clear.

History
PRÓ-VIDA began in 1978, in the district of Moema, in São Paulo city, when Dr. Celso created Pró-Mente, where he himself gave courses about mental development and training. In the following year, PRÓ-VIDA Integração Cósmica (Cosmic Integration) was created.

In 1979, the Central Geral do Dízimo was founded, and started to donate to various charities.

The Clube de Campo PRÓ-VIDA (PRÓ-VIDA Country Club) was created in 1980, in Araçoiaba da Serra county, near Sorocaba, in the interior of São Paulo State.

By the end of 1981, year of the death of its creator and founder, Dr. Celso Charuri, PRÓ-VIDA had more than 12,000 students.

In 1989, PRÓ-VIDA started promoting courses away from its headquarters, in various cities in São Paulo state and also in Minas Gerais state.

In 1990, the first course outside Brazil was promoted, in Buenos Aires, Argentina, where in 1995 the headquarters of PRÓ-VIDA were established and in 1997, a Country Club in the Buenos Aires Province.

Following Argentina, at least six other countries promotes courses of PRÓ-VIDA nowadays: Bolivia, Chile, Italy, Mexico, Paraguay, Portugal, Spain and the United States of America.

In 1996, PRÓ-VIDA moved its São Paulo headquarters to the district of Alto de Pinheiros.

As of 1998, participants who lived outside São Paulo city started to get together to create PRÓ-VIDA chapters in their own towns. Presently, PRÓ-VIDA has tens of nuclei of participants in various Brazilian cities as well as abroad.

Courses
The PRÓ-VIDA courses are organized in nine stages. Each one of the first three, called Basic, Advanced 1, and Introduction, last for a week. According to the institution, in these courses "themes within the mental, physical and spiritual spheres" are discussed and analyzed.

The courses are given by instructors trained among the students, some of which had been students under Dr. Celso Charuri.

In the Basic course, various themes about the properties of the brain are touched, such as sleep and dreams, levels of brain function and brain frequencies and also such themes as energy, aura and pyramids. Besides, courses include a practical part where one can train methods of relaxation and mental visualization.

Central Geral do Dízimo
The Central Geral do Dízimo PRÓ-VIDA (CGD), a non-economic organization, acknowledged as a "public utility charity institution", in municipal, state and federal jurisdiction, donates to charities such as hospitals, day care centers, elderly care, orphanages and institutions that offer treatment and education for disabled children. According to statistics published by the institution, more than 12,000 entities have already benefitted, receiving vehicles, ambulances, building material, hospital and medical equipment and supplies, and complete workshops, among other items.

The funds for the Central Geral do Dízimo are gathered through anonymous bank deposits. The money obtained - except for a yearly tax for the functioning charged by the São Paulo city administration - is totally donated to charities, and this can be verified in the yearly audit reports, by Deloitte Touche Tohmatsu.

Besides, CGD has agreements with SENAI and the Paula Souza Foundation. Through these agreements, CGD builds vocational schools and equips them completely - including furniture, industrial machinery, tools, computers, etc. - and hands them over to those entities, which from then on administer them pedagogically and administratively.<ref name="Schools">Vocational schools donated by Central Geral do Dízimo (in Portuguese). Retrieved 10 August 2022

According to rules published by the organization, "the charities awarded by Central Geral do Dízimo are previously analyzed, and must show reliability, and be in recognized and actual operation, in addition to being regulated at the proper authorities".

Country Club
Clube de Campo PRÓ-VIDA is an independent institution, that works just as any other social club, in which access is for members only, in this case, some participants of PRÓ-VIDA who become members voluntarily.

This club was created with the objective of stimulating and deepening the interaction among PRÓ-VIDA participants. In these places, cultural, social and athletic activities are promoted.

At present, there are four units: Clube de Campo PRÓ-VIDA, in Araçoiaba da Serra, São Paulo State, Clube de Campo PRÓ-VIDA das Araucárias, in Paraná State, Clube de Campo PRO-VIDA de Paraguaçu, in Minas Gerais State and Club de Campo PRÓ-VIDA de Baradero, in Argentina.

Controversies
The discreet way that PRÓ-VIDA has adopted for its activities and its courses, in its 30 years of existence, has aroused curiosity and generated polemics in some environments. There are no records of any public announcements made by the organization, which seems to be averse to publicity. Its only public manifestation is through the Central Geral do Dízimo.

In 1996, the Brazilian version of women's magazine Marie Claire had a journalist take a PRÓ-VIDA course and then report her experience. In this story some issues were raised that have been serving as reference material for critics of the institution.

According to the report, the institute would aim mainly for profit: besides the courses being paid for, the Central Geral do Dízimo and the Clube de Campo would be additional forms of revenue. The journalist also claims that the contents of the PRÓ-VIDA courses would be pseudo-scientific and would use well-established scientific concepts in a twisted way, removing them from their original context, to try to prove its theories and justify the existence of paranormal phenomena. After the conclusion of the fundamental courses, to gain access to more advanced courses, it is necessary to be submitted to an evaluation. The report relates cases of participants who remained for more than ten years in this process and have never been approved for the subsequent stages.

Still according to the report, the Clube de Campo accepts as members only PRÓ-VIDA participants and when a member, who may also have a cottage in the club, stops being a participant of PRÓ-VIDA, they are invited to withdraw their membership and gets less money in return than the amount originally paid.

It seems to be a policy of PRÓ-VIDA not to defend itself publicly from any kind of criticism, keeping its activities independent.

See also
 Kemetism

References

External links
Official Site - English version

Spiritual organizations
Educational organisations based in Brazil